The Northeast Bantu languages are a group of Bantu languages spoken in East Africa. In Guthrie's geographic classification, they fall within Bantu zones E50 plus E46 (Sonjo), E60 plus E74a (Taita), F21–22, J, G60, plus Northeast Coast Bantu (of zones E & G). Some of these languages (F21, most of E50, and some of J) share a phonological innovation called Dahl's law that is unlikely to be borrowed as a productive process, though individual words reflecting Dahl's law have been borrowed into neighboring languages.

The languages, or clusters, are: 

Kikuyu–Kamba  Thagiicu (primarily E50):
Sonjo (E40)
Cuka
Meru (incl. Tharaka, Mwimbi-Muthambi)
South
Kamba, Daisu
Gikuyu, Embu
Chaga–Taita
Taita (Dawida; E70) – Sagalla
Chaga languages (E60)
Northeast Coast Bantu (G10-G40): Swahili (E70), etc.
Takama: Sukuma–Nyamwezi (+ Konongo–Ruwila), Kimbu (F20), Iramba–Isanzu, Nyaturu (Rimi) (F30), ?Holoholo–Tumbwe–Lumbwe (D20)
Great Lakes Bantu (zone J): Rwanda-Rundi, Ganda, etc.
Bena–Kinga (G60): Sangu, Hehe, Bena, Pangwa, Kinga–Magoma, Wanji, Kisi, ?Manda (N10)

Notes